Night Song is an album by American jazz pianist Ahmad Jamal featuring performances recorded in 1980 and released on the Motown label.

Track listing
 "When You Wish Upon a Star" (Leigh Harline, Ned Washington) – 4:51
 "Deja Vu" (Isaac Hayes, Adrienne Anderson) – 5:02
 "Need to Smile" (Sonelius Smith) – 5:29
 "Bad Times" (Gerard McMahon) – 4:30
 "Touch Me in the Morning" (Michael Masser, Ron Miller) – 4:48
 "Night Song" (Lee Adams, Charles Strouse) – 6:56
 "Theme From M*A*S*H" (Mike Altman, Johnny Mandel) – 4:43
 "Something's Missing in My Life" (Paul Jabara, Jay Asher) – 4:03

Personnel
 Ahmad Jamal – keyboards
 Oscar Brashear, Robert O’Bryant – trumpet
 Maurice Spears, Garnett Brown – trombone
 Pete Christlieb – alto saxophone
 Ernie Fields – baritone saxophone
 Dean Paul Gant – keyboards
 Calvin Keys, Greg Purce – guitar
 John Heard, Kenneth Burke – bass
 Chester Thompson – drums
 Gil Askey – arranger, keyboards

References 

Motown albums
Ahmad Jamal albums
1980 albums